Driebergen-Zeist is a railway station located between Driebergen-Rijsenburg and Zeist, Netherlands. It is located in the municipality of Utrechtse Heuvelrug. The station was opened on 17 June 1844 and is located on the Amsterdam–Arnhem railway. The station is operated by Nederlandse Spoorwegen. In 2018 there were approximately 8,787 passengers per day using Driebergen-Zeist station. The station underwent a major uprade between 2017 and 2020 which provided additional bicycle parking and removed a nearby level crossing.

Train services
The following services currently call at Driebergen-Zeist:

2x per hour Intercity service Schiphol - Utrecht - Arnhem - Nijmegen
2x per hour local service (sprinter) (Uitgeest - Amsterdam -) Breukelen - Utrecht - Rhenen
2x per hour local service (sprinter) Breukelen - Utrecht - Veenendaal Centrum

Bus services
Bus services depart from a bus station at the front of the station. These include:

43 - Zeist - Driebergen - Odijk
50 - Utrecht - De Bilt - Zeist - Driebergen - Doorn - Leersum - Amerongen - Elst - Rhenen - Wageningen
51 - Utrecht Centraal - Wittevrouwen - De Bilt - Zeist - Driebergen-Zeist
56 - Amersfoort - Soesterberg - Huis ter Heide - Zeist - Driebergen - Doorn - Wijk bij Duurstede
71 - Nieuwegein - Utrecht Rijnsweerd - De Uithof - De Bilt - Zeist - Driebergen - Doorn
75 - Driebergen-Zeist - Rijsenberg
81 - Woudenberg - Zeist - Driebergen - Doorn - Leersum - Amerongen - Veenendaal
450 Utrecht - De Bilt - Zeist - Driebergen - Doorn - Leersum - Amerongen (Night bus)

References

External links

NS website 
Dutch Public Transport journey planner 

Railway stations in Utrecht (province)
Railway stations opened in 1844
Railway stations on the Rhijnspoorweg
Utrechtse Heuvelrug
Railway stations in the Netherlands opened in 1844